This is an incomplete list of hurlers who have played at senior level for the Tipperary county team. The players in this list included are from 1887 onwards. This list also includes a number of players from the first county selection in 1886, a year before the first All-Ireland Senior Championship. This list is an A-Z of Tipperary senior hurlers that have donned the blue and gold jersey of Tipperary and the All-Ireland SHC and Munster SHC medals that they have individually won. This list also includes players from the incomplete 1888 championship that was never finished due to the GAA's invasion of America.


A

B

C

D

E

F

G

H

I

J

K

L

M

N

O

P

Q

R

S

T

W

Y

See also

http://www.tippgaaarchives.com/ for all information about past Tipperary hurlers and footballers at all levels

Hurlers
Tipperary